Regina Ann Schock (born August 31, 1957) is an American musician, best known as the drummer for the rock band The Go-Go's.

Schock was inducted into the Rock and Roll Hall of Fame in October 2021 as a member of The Go-Go's.

Career 

Schock's career began as drummer for Edie and the Eggs, a band assembled to feature the John Waters star Edith Massey. After her stint in Edie and the Eggs, Schock relocated to Los Angeles, California. Soon after, in 1979, she joined The Go-Go's, replacing Elissa Bello as the band's drummer. Schock recorded and toured steadily with The Go-Go's until the group disbanded in 1985 and reformed a few years later. She had open-heart surgery before the tour supporting the band's 1984 album Talk Show. The Go-Go's announced their breakup in 1985, but played reunion gigs in 1990 and 1994. 

In 1985, Schock was occasionally seen on television appearances as the drummer of the Norwegian band a-ha. However, this was just for promo on television, as she was never part of the official band. In 1987, Schock and Vance DeGeneres formed the band House of Schock. In 1997, she joined Dominique Davalos and Kathy Valentine's band The Delphines.

In 1997, Schock sued the other members of The Go-Go's for unpaid royalties. She demanded $100,000 in compensation and an accounting, claiming that she had not received any income from the band since 1986.

Schock co-wrote, with Ted Bruner and Trey Vittetoe, the title track of Miley Cyrus' 2008 album, Breakout. The song was previously recorded by Katy Perry. She also co-wrote "Naturally", recorded in 2009 by Selena Gomez.

The Go-Go's announced an 11-date reunion tour scheduled to begin in June 2020; however, in May of that year the tour was postponed due to the COVID-19 pandemic. In May 2021 it was announced that The Go-Go's would be inducted into the Rock and Roll Hall of Fame. The band confirmed plans for a 2022 UK tour with Billy Idol that would start in June 2022.

Schock's book, Made in Hollywood: All Access With the Go-Go's, was published in 2021. The book consists of her photos of the Go-Go's and Schock's own writing. It also features writing from Jodie Foster, Paul Reubens, Martha Quinn, Kate Pierson, Dave Stewart, and members of the band, including a foreword from Kathy Valentine.

Personal life 
In 1984, Schock was diagnosed with a hole in her heart.

References

External links 
Gina Schock Interview NAMM Oral History Library (2015)

1957 births
Living people
American rock drummers
People from Dundalk, Maryland
The Go-Go's members
American new wave musicians
American women drummers
New wave drummers
20th-century American drummers
20th-century American women musicians
21st-century American women
Women in punk